The Highland Council Headquarters, formerly County Buildings, is a municipal structure in Glenurquhart Road, Inverness, Highland, Scotland. The oldest part of the complex, which currently serves as the headquarters of The Highland Council, is a Category C listed building.

History

The oldest part of the current structure is the main frontage on Ardross Road which was commissioned by the Northern Counties Collegiate School, an educational establishment which was founded with strong connections with the Army and India in 1873. It was designed by Alexander Ross in the Gothic Revival style, built in coursed stone and was completed in 1876.

The design involved a symmetrical main frontage of eleven bays facing onto Ardross Street with the end bays slightly projected forward as pavilions. The central bay, which also slightly projected forward, featured an arched pend on the ground floor, a bi-partite cusped window flanked by two single cusped windows on the first floor, and a battlement above. The wings were fenestrated by bi-partite plain windows on the ground floor and bi-partite cusped windows on the first floor. The end bays were fenestrated by tri-partite plain windows on the ground floor and quadri-partite cusped windows on the first floor with gables containing rose windows above.

The building was extended by two bays along Glenurquhart Road to a design by the same architect in 1885. It was requisitioned for use by the Admiralty during the First World War. After the war, it was acquired by the County Education Authority and converted for use as the Inverness Royal Academy War Memorial Hostel. After the hostel moved to Culduthel Road in Inverness in the early 1930s, Inverness-shire County Council progressively moved its departments from Inverness Castle into the building and renamed it "County Buildings".

The complex was extended further along Glenurquhart Road with a modern structure built of brick and glass which was completed in 1963. A bespoke building, intended to accommodate the council chamber, was erected at the west end of the complex. After the abolition of Inverness-shire County Council in 1975, the building became the headquarters of Highland Regional Council and following the introduction of unitary authorities in 1995, it became the headquarters of The Highland Council.

Works of art in the building include a portrait by Charles Martin Hardie of Captain Abraham Howling, Master of Trinity House.

See also
 List of listed buildings in Inverness

References

External links

Government buildings completed in 1876
County halls in Scotland
Category C listed buildings in Highland (council area)
Buildings and structures in Inverness